Events in the year 1868 in Iceland.

Incumbents 

 Monarch: Christian IX
 Council President of Denmark: Christian Emil Krag-Juel-Vind-Frijs

Deaths 

 8 March − Jón Thoroddsen elder, poet

References 

 
1860s in Iceland
Years of the 19th century in Iceland
Iceland
Iceland